William John Owen Rowbotham,  (14 March 1914 – 12 July 1999) was an English actor and songwriter. He was the father of actor Tom Owen. He is best known for portraying Compo Simmonite in the Yorkshire-based BBC comedy series Last of the Summer Wine for over a quarter of a century. He died on 12 July 1999, his last appearance on-screen being shown in April 2000.

Early life and career
Born at Acton Green, London to a working-class family (his father a staunchly left-wing tram-driver), Owen made his first film appearance in 1945, but did not achieve lasting fame until 1973, when he took the co-starring role of William "Compo" Simmonite in the long-running British sitcom Last of the Summer Wine. Compo is a scruffy working-class pensioner, often exploited by the bossy characters played by Michael Bates, Brian Wilde, Michael Aldridge and Frank Thornton for dirty jobs, stunts and escapades, while their indomitably docile friend Norman Clegg, played by Peter Sallis, follows and watches with a smirk. He wore a woollen hat and spent much of his time lusting after dowdy housewife Nora Batty. The series, starting in 1973 and finishing in 2010, is today the world's longest-running comedy series. Owen became an icon, a darling of its audience and central to its success and episodes for 26 years, right until his death. The threesome of Compo, Clegg and Foggy (this third character was initially Blamire, played by Michael Bates, and when Brian Wilde's Foggy took a hiatus, replaced by Michael Aldridge's, Seymour Utterthwaite) remains the most popular group of three the show ever produced. Foggy was replaced in 1997 by Frank Thornton's character Herbert 'Truly' Truelove, who remained in the show until its final episode in 2010.

Owen served in the Royal Army Ordnance Corps during World War II, where he was injured in an explosion during a battle training course. His first screen role was in the 1941 short Tank Patrol, produced by the Ministry of Information.

During the 1960s, Owen had a successful second career as a songwriter, with compositions including the hit "Marianne", recorded by Cliff Richard. At this time he also collaborated with songwriter Tony Russell on the musical The Matchgirls about the London matchgirls strike of 1888. He co-starred as Spike Milligan's straight man in the West End hit Son of Oblomov in 1964. Owen also recorded a novelty song with Kathy Staff in 1983 called "Nora Batty's Stockings".

Owen was a regular in the early Carry On films  - Sergeant (1958), Nurse (1959), Regardless (1961) and Cabby (1963) and also featured in several Lindsay Anderson films including O Lucky Man! (1973) and In Celebration (1974). On TV had had regular roles playing Fred Cuddell in 13 episodes of Taxi! (1963); Sergeant Sam Short in 13 episodes of Copper's End (1971), George Edwards in 4 episodes of Emergency-Ward 10 and George Chambers (Thelma's father) in 4 episodes of Whatever Happened to the Likely Lads?. He also had a cameo appearance in Brideshead Revisited as Lunt, Charles Ryder's scout during his days at the University of Oxford.

Personal life 
Owen was a staunch socialist and supporter of the Labour Party. Peter Sallis described Owen as being "slightly to the left of Lenin" and claimed that Owen's left-wing views contrasted so much with the right-wing opinions of Michael Bates that Last of the Summer Wine was almost not made because of their arguments. Owen was a founding member of the Keep Sunday Special campaign group, and president of Arts for Labour, a campaign group of performers linked to the Labour Party. He was awarded the MBE in 1977.

He was the subject of This Is Your Life in 1980 when he was surprised by Eamonn Andrews in Trafalgar Square.

Illness and death 
While filming the Last of the Summer Wine French special for the millennium of 2000, Owen fell ill but insisted on continuing despite being in pain; when he got back to England, he was confirmed as having pancreatic and bowel cancer.

He continued working right up to his death from pancreatic cancer in Westminster, London, on 12 July 1999. Owen is buried in the churchyard of St John's Parish Church, Upperthong, near his beloved town of Holmfirth in Yorkshire, the home of Last of the Summer Wine. His co-star Peter Sallis was buried next to him after his death aged 96 in June 2017.

Selected television roles

Selected filmography

 Breathing Space (1943) - Songwriter (Uncredited)
 The Way to the Stars (1945) – 'Nobby' Clarke (as Bill Rowbotham)
 Perfect Strangers (1945) – (uncredited)
 School for Secrets (1946) – Paratroop Sergeant (as Bill Rowbotham)
 Dancing with Crime (1947) – Dave Robinson (as Bill Rowbotham)
 Holiday Camp (1947) – Bit Role (uncredited)
 When the Bough Breaks (1947) – Bill Collins
 Easy Money (1948) – Mr. Lee
 Daybreak (1948) – Ron
 My Brother's Keeper (1948) – Syd Evans
 The Weaker Sex (1948) – Soldier with Chicken
 Once a Jolly Swagman (1949) – Lag Gibbon
 Trottie True (1949) – Joe Jugg
 Diamond City (1949) – Pinto
 The Girl Who Couldn't Quite (1950) – Tim
 The Astonished Heart (1950) – Mr. Burton (uncredited)
 Hotel Sahara (1951) – Private Binns
 The Story of Robin Hood and His Merrie Men (1952) – Stutely
 The Square Ring (1953) – Happy Burns
 There Was a Young Lady (1953) – Joe
 A Day to Remember (1953) – Shorty Sharpe
 The Rainbow Jacket (1954) – Sam
 The Ship That Died of Shame (1955) – Birdie
 Not So Dusty (1956) – Dusty Grey
 Davy (1958) – Eric
 Carve Her Name with Pride (1958) – N.C.O. Instructor
 Carry On Sergeant (1958) – Corporal Bill Copping
 Carry On Nurse (1959) – Percy 'Perc' Hickson
 The Shakedown (1960) – David Spettigue
 The Hellfire Club (1961) – Martin
 Carry On Regardless (1961) – Mike Weston
 On the Fiddle (1961) – Corporal Gittens
 Carry On Cabby (1963) – Smiley Sims
 The Masque of the Red Death (1964) – Male Dancer (uncredited)
 The Secret of Blood Island (1964) – Bludgin
 Georgy Girl (1966) – Ted
 The Fighting Prince of Donegal (1966) – Officer Powell
 Headline Hunters (1968) – Henry
 O Lucky Man! (1973) – Supt. Barlow / Insp. Carding
 In Celebration (1975) – Mr. Shaw
 The Comeback (1978) – Mr. B

References

External links 
 
 

1914 births
1999 deaths
Deaths from cancer in England
Deaths from pancreatic cancer
English male film actors
English male television actors
English songwriters
British novelty song performers
Members of the Order of the British Empire
Royal Army Ordnance Corps soldiers
British Army personnel of World War II
20th-century English male actors
British male comedy actors
People from Acton, London